Boletopsis smithii is a species of hydnoid fungus in the family Bankeraceae. It was described as new to science in 1975 by mycologist Keith A. Harrison, from collections made in Washington.

References

External links

Fungi described in 1975
Fungi of the United States
Thelephorales
Fungi without expected TNC conservation status